Elliss is a surname. Notable people with the surname include:

Christian Elliss (born 1999), American football player
Kaden Elliss (born 1995), American football player
Luther Elliss (born 1973), American football player
Noah Elliss (born 1999), American football player

See also
Ellias
Ellis